Kenneth Hunt (4 December 1902 – 16 March 1971) was an English cricketer. He played two first-class matches, one for the Royal Navy in 1925 and one for Gloucestershire between in 1926.

References

External links

1902 births
1971 deaths
English cricketers
Royal Navy cricketers
Gloucestershire cricketers
Cricketers from Bristol